Steve Topper (born 16 April 1961) is an Australian former professional rugby league footballer who played in the 1970s and 1980s.  Topper was a foundation player for Illawarra playing in the club's first game.  Topper is the older brother of former Cronulla-Sutherland player Stuart Topper.

Playing career
Topper made his first grade debut for Souths in Round 1 1979 against Newtown at Redfern Oval.

In 1980, Topper was selected to play for NSW Country against NSW City.

In 1982, Topper joined newly admitted Illawarra and played in the club's first ever game which was against Penrith at WIN Stadium and ended in a 17–7 loss.

Topper played with Illawarra until the end of the 1984 season before retiring.

References

1961 births
Living people
South Sydney Rabbitohs players
Country New South Wales rugby league team players
Illawarra Steelers players
Australian rugby league players
Rugby league halfbacks
Rugby league hookers
Rugby league players from Sydney